Palma Violets were an English band from Lambeth, London. The band formed in 2011, based on the musical partnership of frontmen Samuel Fryer and Chilli Jesson.

The band's musical output is primarily in the indie rock genre, with some garage rock and psychedelic influences. Palma Violets' first single, "Best of Friends", was voted NME's song of the year for 2012, and their debut album 180 was released on 25 February 2013.

Much like The Libertines, the band gained a substantial fan base online before the release of their first single – with multiple live videos of their gigs being uploaded by fans. The band are signed to Rough Trade Records. Palma Violets appeared on the 2013 NME Awards Tour, along with Miles Kane, Django Django and Peace. Since that time they have been heavily promoted by NME and have appeared in numerous magazine editions.

On 9 December 2012, the BBC announced that the band had been nominated for the Sound of 2013 poll.

Biography
Palma Violets were formed by bassist/vocalist Alexander "Chilli" Jesson, guitarist/vocalist Samuel Thomas Fryer, keyboardist Jeffrey Peter Mayhew and drummer William Martin Doyle (not to be confused with East India Youth). On 10 January, the band premièred their track, "Step Up for the Cool Cats" on BBC Radio 1. Having been selected as Zane Lowe's Hottest Record in the World, the Steve Mackey-produced track was released on to iTunes shortly after; serving as the second single to be taken from 180 following the Rory Attwell produced debut single, and winner of NME's 'Track of the Year 2012', "Best of Friends".

On 16 February the band premiered the track "Danger in the Club" on BBC Radio 1. The next day they announced the release of their new album Danger in the Club, produced by John Leckie would be released 4 May via Rough Trade Records.

In December 2015, the band released a Christmas song called "Last Christmas on Planet Earth" with a release on 7" vinyl which featured on the B Side a rendition of "All the Garden Birds", sung by The Rhythm Studio Kids Choir.

Following the release of Danger in the Club, there was a noted silence from the band on social media leading to speculation that the band had split up. This was confirmed in an interview by Matt Wilkinson with guitarist Sam Fryer on 11 July 2018. All the members of Palma Violets bar Chilli Jesson are currently in a new band called Gently Tender with Celia Archer of The Big Moon. Of the affair he noted "We didn't fall out or anything like that. We just changed as people. We were 18 when we started the band and everything is quite easy to get on the same page, write the same kind of music all the time. Whereas when you hit 24 after 5 years of touring, I think you just become different people and we naturally just moved on"  Chilli Jesson went on to form the band Crewel Intentions, before going solo to release singles such as "Love Is A Serious Mental Illness", "St. Vitamin" and "Circles".

Discography

Studio albums

EPs

Singles

Filmography

Awards and nominations

References

External links

 

Musical groups established in 2011
Musical quartets
Musical groups from London
English indie rock groups
NME Awards winners
2011 establishments in England
Musical groups disestablished in 2016